Fayette County is located in the central part of the U.S. state of Kentucky. As of the 2020 census, the population was 322,570, making it the second-most populous county in the commonwealth. Its territory, population and government are coextensive with the city of Lexington, which also serves as the county seat. Fayette County is part of the Lexington–Fayette, KY Metropolitan Statistical Area.

History

Fayette County—originally Fayette County, Virginia—was established by the Virginia General Assembly in June 1780, when it abolished and subdivided Kentucky County into three counties: Fayette, Jefferson and Lincoln. Together, these counties and those set off from them later in that decade separated from Virginia in 1792 to become the Commonwealth of Kentucky.

Originally, Fayette County included land which makes up 37 present-day counties and parts of 7 others. It was reduced to its present boundaries in 1799. The county is named for the Marquis de LaFayette, who came to America to support the rebelling English colonies in the American Revolutionary War.

On January 1, 1974, Fayette County merged its government with that of its county seat of Lexington, creating a consolidated city-county governed by the Lexington-Fayette Urban County Government.

Geography

Major highways

 Interstate 75
 Interstate 64
 U.S. Route 25
 U.S. Route 27
 U.S. Route 60
 U.S. Route 68
 U.S. Route 421
 Kentucky Route 4, a.k.a. New Circle Road

Adjacent counties
 Scott County  (north)
 Bourbon County  (northeast)
 Clark County  (east)
 Madison County  (south)
 Jessamine County  (south)
 Woodford County  (west)

Demographics

As of the census of 2010, there were 295,803 people, 123,043 households, and 69,661 families residing in the county. The racial makeup of the county was 75.7% White, 14.5% Black or African American, 0.3% Native American, 3.2% Asian, 0.1% Pacific Islander, 3.7% from other races, and 2.5% from two or more races.  6.9% of the population were Hispanic or Latino of any race.

There were 123,043 households, out of which 25.7% had children under the age of 18 living with them, 40.1% were married couples living together, 12.3% had a female householder with no husband present, and 43.4% were non-families. 32.7% of all households were made up of individuals, and 8.0% had someone living alone who was 65 years of age or older.  The average household size was 2.3 and the average family size was 2.94.

In the county, the population was spread out, with 21.2% under the age of 18, 5.9% from 18 to 21, and 62.4% from 21 to 65. 10.5% were 65 years of age or older.  The median age was 33.7 years. 50.8% of the population was female.

The median income for a household in the county was $47,469, and the median income for a family was $66,690. Males had a median income of $44,343 versus $35,716 for females. The per capita income for the county was $28,345.  About 11.1% of families and 17.4% of the population were below the poverty line, including 21.6% of those under age 18 and 8.6% of those age 65 or over.

Education

Public high schools
Schools in the county are operated by Fayette County Public Schools.
 Henry Clay High School
 Paul Laurence Dunbar High School
 Frederick Douglass High School
 Bryan Station High School
 Lafayette High School
 Tates Creek High School
 STEAM Academy

Private middle and elementary schools
 The Lexington School
 Sayre School
 Lexington Christian Academy
 Christ the King School
 Mary Queen of the Holy Rosary School
 Saints Peter and Paul School
 Seton Catholic School
 Blue Grass Baptist School
 Redwood Cooperative School

Private high schools
 Lexington Catholic High School
 Lexington Christian Academy
 Sayre School
 Trinity Christian Academy
 Blue Grass Baptist School

Colleges and universities

 Bluegrass Community and Technical College
 Indiana Wesleyan University (Lexington campus)
 ITT Technical Institute
 Lexington Theological Seminary
 Midway College (Lexington campus)
 National College of Business & Technology
 Spencerian College
 Sullivan University
 Transylvania University
 University of Kentucky

Politics
For much of the 20th century, Fayette County leaned more Republican than Kentucky as a whole. Between 1952 and 2004, it voted for the Republican nominee all but twice, for Lyndon B. Johnson in 1964 and Bill Clinton in 1996, with the latter only carrying the county by a narrow plurality. Even Southern Democrat Jimmy Carter lost the county by 11 points in 1976, despite winning Kentucky by a comfortable margin.

Until the mid-2000s, it did not swing as heavily to the Democrats as other urban counties. From 1992 to 2016, it was a swing county with close results between the two parties.  In 2008, Barack Obama became the first Democrat to win the county since Bill Clinton in 1996, and the first Democrat to win a majority of its votes since Johnson. In 2016, Hillary Clinton won the county by the largest margin since Johnson, although it was one of only two counties in the entire Commonwealth to vote for her, the other being Jefferson County, home to the city of Louisville. In 2020, Joe Biden turned in the strongest showing for a Democrat in the county in over a century, bettering even Franklin D. Roosevelt. In that year, Fayette County was the most Democratic county in the Commonwealth, giving Biden a slightly larger margin than Jefferson County, marking the first time since 1948 that Fayette County voted to the left of Jefferson County in a presidential election.
 This marked the first time that Fayette County was the most Democratic county in the state in Kentucky history. With nearly 60% of the vote, Biden received the highest percentage of the vote in the county of any Democratic candidate in history.

Also in 2020, Donald Trump received the lowest portion of the vote for any Republican candidate in the county since William Howard Taft in 1912.

Communities

Cities
 Lexington

Unincorporated communities

 Andover
 Athens
 Clays Ferry
 Colby (partly in Clark County)
 Little Texas
 South Elkhorn
 Spears (partly in Jessamine County)
 Todds Station

Historically black hamlets
 Bracktown
 Cadentown
 Jimtown
 Smithtown
 Little Georgetown
 Pralltown

See also

 National Register of Historic Places listings in Fayette County, Kentucky

References

External links

 Kentucky State Data Center
 Lexington Area Metropolitan Planning Organization
 Lexington-Fayette Urban County Government
 Fayette County Prosecutor's Office
 Fayette County Sheriff's Office

 
Kentucky counties
Lexington–Fayette metropolitan area
1780 establishments in Virginia
Populated places established in 1780
Former counties of Virginia